Eric Cameron Stoltz (born September 30, 1961) is an American actor, director and producer. He played Rocky Dennis in the biographical drama film Mask, which earned him the nomination for the Golden Globe Award for Best Supporting Actor in a Motion Picture, and has appeared in a wide variety of films, from mainstream ones including Some Kind of Wonderful to independent films such as Pulp Fiction, Killing Zoe and Kicking and Screaming. He was nominated for the Independent Spirit Award for Best Supporting Male for his performance in Pulp Fiction. In 2010, he portrayed Daniel Graystone in the science fiction television series Caprica and became a regular director on the television series Glee.

Early life
Stoltz was born in Whittier, California, the son of Evelyn (née Vawter), a violinist and schoolteacher and Jack Stoltz, an elementary school teacher. He has two sisters, Catherine, an opera singer, and Susan, a writer.

Stoltz was raised in both American Samoa and Santa Barbara, California. He attended the University of Southern California, but dropped out after his junior year. He moved to New York in 1981 and studied acting with Stella Adler and Peggy Feury.

Career

1978–1999
In the 1970s, Stoltz joined a repertory company that performed ten plays at the Edinburgh Festival. He returned to the United States in 1979, when he entered USC as a drama student, but subsequently dropped out to pursue film and television roles.

In 1978, he was cast as Steve Benson in the television adaptation of Erma Bombeck's The Grass Is Always Greener over the Septic Tank.

Director Cameron Crowe and Stoltz became friends while making Stoltz's first feature film, Fast Times at Ridgemont High (1982), which Crowe wrote and in which Stoltz had a minor role. According to Stoltz, Crowe promised Stoltz roles in all of his future films.

He appeared in each of Crowe's next four films, The Wild Life (1984), Say Anything... (1989), Singles (1992) and  Jerry Maguire (1996).

In 1985, Stoltz received a Golden Globe nomination for good starring performance as Rocky Dennis in Mask. Among his other roles in the 1980s, he appeared in the 1987 film Some Kind of Wonderful, written and produced by John Hughes.

Stoltz was originally cast as Marty McFly in Back to the Future. His view of the movie clashed, however, with that of the director, Robert Zemeckis. While the film was to become a sci-fi comedy (and box office smash hit), Stoltz had read the script from a more serious angle, apparently focusing on the tragic consequences of going back to live a life that was not one's own. Five weeks into shooting, Zemeckis replaced Stoltz with Michael J. Fox.

During the 1990s, Stoltz went back and forth between stage, film and television, appearing in studio and independent films such as The Waterdance (1992), Pulp Fiction (1994), Grace Of My Heart (1996) and Anaconda (1997).

During the 1990s, Stoltz produced the films Bodies, Rest & Motion (1993), Sleep with Me (1994) and Mr. Jealousy (1997).

He continued to appear on the New York stage, both on Broadway (Three Sisters, Two Shakespearean Actors, Arms and the Man,  Our Town) and off-Broadway (The Importance of Being Earnest, The Glass Menagerie, Sly Fox). He was nominated for a Tony Award as Featured Actor for his performance as George Gibbs in the 1989 Broadway revival of Thornton Wilder's Our Town.

A performance of this production was featured on Great Performances: Live from Lincoln Center, which received a 1989 Emmy nomination.

On television, he had a recurring role as Helen Hunt's character's ex-boyfriend on Mad About You (five episodes, 1994–1998), spent a year on Chicago Hope (1994) and did some television and cable films such as Inside (1996) (directed by Arthur Penn) and The Passion of Ayn Rand (1999), with Helen Mirren. Stoltz received the Indie Sup(Y)port Award at the 1998 Los Angeles Film Festival.

2000–present
During the first part of the 2000s, he starred with Gillian Anderson in The House of Mirth (2000), based on the novel by Edith Wharton. From 2001 to 2002, he had a recurring role as the English teacher-poet August Dimitri in ABC's Once and Again, wherein Julia Whelan's character, a teenager, fell in love with his character. He directed an episode of the show in 2002.

In 2003, he played his first leading TV role in Out of Order, which was canceled after five episodes. In 2004, he appeared in The Butterfly Effect as a child molester; the following year, he guest-starred in the NBC sitcom Will & Grace as Debra Messing's love interest. He was nominated for a Daytime Emmy for his direction of the cable movie My Horrible Year! (2001). He also directed a short film entitled The Bulls as well as the highest rated episode of Law & Order in 2005, entitled "Tombstone". He appeared in the music video of The Residents' "Give It to Someone Else", featured on The Commercial DVD.

He has contributed essays to the books City Secrets--New York as well as Life Interrupted by Spalding Gray and appears on the children's CD Philadelphia Chickens.

Beginning in 2007, Stoltz directed episodes of the drama series Quarterlife, which began airing as webisodes and were then picked up to air on the NBC network in 2008. Stoltz played a serial killer in need of medical attention in three episodes of the fifth season of Grey's Anatomy. He has also directed two episodes of Grey's Anatomy.

Stoltz starred as Daniel Graystone, inventor of the Cylons, in the science fiction television series Caprica, a prequel set 58 years before the Battlestar Galactica series.

He became a regular director of Glee, directing a total of 12 episodes, including "Nationals", in which the Glee club finally wins the championship.

In 2011 Stoltz was seen back on the silver screen with the film Fort McCoy; he earned accolades for his leading role as a conflicted barber of German heritage forced to suppress his American patriotism after moving his family to a post–World War II military base housing a German POW camp.

Starting in 2014, Stoltz became the producing director of the CBS political drama series Madam Secretary.  The following year he became one of its four executive producers, alongside Morgan Freeman and Barbara Hall and has directed more than 10 episodes, as well as starring alongside Téa Leoni in several episodes as her brother, Will Adams.

Personal life
Stoltz met Bridget Fonda in 1986 and they began dating in 1990. The relationship ended after eight years.

In 2005, Stoltz married Bernadette Moley, a singer and former animator for Disney who migrated to the United States from Ireland.

Stoltz is a vegetarian.

Filmography

Actor

Film

Television

Director

Film

Television

He has directed many shows on The Learning Channel, TLC Network.

Producer

Films

References

External links

1961 births
20th-century American male actors
21st-century American male actors
American male film actors
American male television actors
American television directors
Living people
Male actors from Santa Barbara, California
USC School of Dramatic Arts alumni
Film directors from California
People from Whittier, California
American expatriate male actors in the United Kingdom